Crataegus lassa, the sandhill hawthorn, is a species of hawthorn native to the southeastern United States. Small trees or large shrubs, they have a characteristic weeping or drooping habit, and grow in pine barrens, the Carolina sandhills region, the Florida longleaf pine sandhills, and similar areas with well-drained soils.

References

lassa
Trees of the Southeastern United States
Plants described in 1901